Radishchevo is an urban locality (an urban-type settlement) in Radishchevsky District of Ulyanovsk Oblast, Russia. Population:

References

Urban-type settlements in Ulyanovsk Oblast
Khvalynsky Uyezd